The 2009–10 season of the NOFV-Oberliga was the second season of the league at tier five (V) of the German football league system.

The NOFV-Oberliga was split into two divisions, the NOFV-Oberliga Nord and the NOFV-Oberliga Süd. The champions of each division, FC Energie Cottbus II and RB Leipzig, were directly promoted to the 2010–11 Regionalliga Nord.

North

Top goalscorers

South

Top goalscorers

External links 
 NOFV-Online – official website of the North-East German Football Association 

NOFV-Oberliga seasons
NOFV